Piscopata (possibly from Quechua pisqu bird, pata step, bank of a river, "bird bank (or step)") is a  mountain in the Vilcanota mountain range in the Andes of Peru. It is situated in the Cusco Region, Canchis Province, Checacupe District. Piscopata lies southwest of Sayrecucho.

References 

Mountains of Cusco Region
Mountains of Peru